The Simons Institute for the Theory of Computing at the University of California, Berkeley is an institute for collaborative research in theoretical computer science.

History
Established on July 1, 2012 with a grant of $60 million from the Simons Foundation, the Institute is housed in Calvin Lab, a dedicated building on the Berkeley campus. The Simons Institute brings together the leading researchers in theoretical computer science and related fields, as well as the next generation of outstanding young scholars, to explore deep unsolved problems about the nature and limits of computation.

Richard M. Karp was Founding Director of the Institute, and fellow Turing Award winner Shafi Goldwasser took over as Director on January 1, 2018.

Mission 
The Institute aims to promote fundamental research on the foundations of computer science, as well as to expand the horizons of the field by exploring other scientific disciplines through a computational lens. This second and distinctive goal is motivated by the fact that natural phenomena in many scientific fields (including mathematics, statistics, physics, astronomy, biology and economics), or the models those fields have developed for these phenomena, are intrinsically computational in nature—from chemical processes in living cells to the self-organizing behavior of complex systems of interacting particles, to mechanisms governing human evolution and the collective behavior of competing agents in an economy. The insights gained from such explorations often reflect back to the theory of computation, opening new directions and advancing our understanding of fundamental issues in complexity theory and algorithms.

Activities 
The Institute's core activities revolve around a rotating sequence of programs; a program typically runs for one semester, and there will usually be two concurrent programs each semester. Run by a small group of organizers, a program typically includes 60-70 long-term participants (a mix of senior and junior researchers), with additional short-term visitors attending workshops during the semester. Junior participants are supported by the Fellowships program.

Program topics are intended to span all areas of theoretical computer science, as well as its connections to other scientific disciplines; the Institute particularly aims to identify programs that can potentially lead to substantial advances in the field, rather than promoting "business as usual".

References

University of California, Berkeley
Research institutes in the San Francisco Bay Area
2012 establishments in California